This is a list of airports in the Gambia. There is only one: Banjul International Airport.

List

See also 
 Transport in the Gambia
 List of airports by ICAO code: G#GB - The Gambia
 Wikipedia: WikiProject Aviation/Airline destination lists: Africa#Gambia

References

External links 
 Great Circle Mapper
 Aircraft Charter World
 World Aero Data

Gambia, the
Airports in the Gambia
Airports
Airports
Gambia